The river Leśna Prawa (Belarusian: Правая Лясная - Pravaja Liasnaja or Pravaya Lyasnaya) is a river in north-eastern Poland and western Belarus. At its confluence with the Lyevaya Lyasnaya near Kamyanyets, the Lyasnaya is formed. The Lyasnaya is a right tributary of the Bug River northwest of Brest.

The Leśna Prawa flows through the geographical region of Europe known as the Wysoczyzny Podlasko – Bialoruskie (English: Podlasie and Belarus Plateau) located within the Podlaskie Voivodeship of Poland and the Hrodna Voblast of Belarus. Major part of the river flows through Puszcza Białowieska.

River flows through: Hajnówka, Topiło, Kamyanyets.

Tributaries: Łuch, Chwiszczej, Perebel, Przewłoka, Miedna.

See also 

 Dąb Car

Rivers of Brest Region
Rivers of Poland
Rivers of Podlaskie Voivodeship
International rivers of Europe
Rivers of Belarus